K-array is an Italy-based manufacturer of loudspeakers and amplification products for the professional audio market. K-array’s products are sold in over 50 countries around the world, and have been used in a variety of environments including major concert tours, cathedrals, stadia, theatres, restaurants and hotels.

History

In 1990, innovative entrepreneurs Carlo Tatini, Alessandro Tatini and Massimo Ferrati founded HP Sound Equipment to design and fit-out broadcast studios for television and radio. After noticing that unbalanced lavalier microphones would pick up hum from electrical equipment nearby, such as dimmers and power distribution, the group created a miniature microphone with integrated pre-amp inside the cartridge. Later, HP Sound began expanding into the manufacture of other product categories, including their own line of MI equipment, and designing OEM solutions for other manufacturers.

In 2005, HP Sound re-positioned their loudspeaker products into a new brand and K-array was named. Shortly after, the live sound-focused company launched its flagship Concert Series range of small-footprint line array products, designed to minimize transport and storage costs during touring. The brand’s first product, the KH4 loudspeaker, weighed 100 lbs and had a depth of 6”.

In the years that followed, K-array has continued to develop line array solutions, including the flat-panel line array modules, alongside slim line column loudspeakers, micro loudspeakers with integrated LED lighting, a flexible rope-like loudspeaker, and a moving head loudspeaker with integrated camera.

In 2020, KSCAPE, a new division of K-array, combines innovative audio with high-end light in one product to provide architects and designers with a single solution that merges senses. RAIL is a 1.2 meter homogenous linear LED track light with full-range cone drivers.

Following in the footsteps of K-array’s 30 years of pro audio research, KGEAR is born in a bid to meet a wider range of users. A new line of fresh pro-audio products that benefit from the uncompromising technologies developed by K-array. With a deep focus on performance and sound quality, KGEAR products offer an easy and straight technical approach to create effective solutions, providing all the features needed to fit any situation and environment.

Technology
K-array has a number of technology ranges that it integrates into products, including SAT (Slim Array Technology).

Slim Array Technology (SAT) was developed to confront issues using large line array elements by substituting the big enclosures with slim boxes. Whereas a big air volume inside a large speaker box in a standard line array is necessary to maximize the speaker efficiency in the mid-low frequency range, a slim box allows sound to exit instantaneously without resonance, generating a significant amount of sound pressure in the low and low-mid range with a fast transient response. Therefore, all sounds characterized by fast transients, like percussion instruments, are reproduced in a more natural way.

Products

Loudspeakers
 Concert Series – Mugello, Firenze (Slim Array Technology-equipped, flat line array elements), Owl (moving head audio) and Mastiff monitor lines
 Installed Sound – Anakonda, Domino, Dragon, Kayman, Kobra, Lyzard, Python, Rumble, Thunder, Tornado, Turtle and Vyper lines
 Portable Systems – Axle and Pinnacle sub-and-satellite systems

Amplifiers
 Kommander power amplifiers

Software
 K-framework – K-array product management software, integrated with Dante audio networking, USB and RS485
 Owl-Manager – software to manage the Owl-KW8 moving-head loudspeaker, with HDSDI and DMX compatibility

Accolades
 EMEA InAVation Awards 2014, Most InAVative Loudspeaker - Anakonda KAN200
 InfoComm 2014 Best Of Show - Anakonda KAN200
 Induction into MuDeTo, the online museum that recognizes Tuscan design excellence, for the Anakonda.

See also
List of loudspeaker manufacturers

References 

Manufacturers of professional audio equipment
Microphone manufacturers
Electronics companies established in 1990
Italian brands
Audio amplifier manufacturers
Loudspeaker manufacturers
Audio equipment manufacturers of Italy
Companies based in Tuscany
Italian companies established in 1990